James John Cunningham (August 15, 1956 – April 29, 2011) was an American professional ice hockey player.

Career 
Cunningham played in one NHL game for the Philadelphia Flyers during the 1977–78 NHL season and spent the rest of his professional career in the minor leagues.

Personal life 
Cunningham was struck and killed by a train on April 29, 2011 in Shoreview, Minnesota.

See also
List of players who played only one game in the NHL

References

External links
 

1956 births
2011 deaths
Accidental deaths in Minnesota
Adirondack Red Wings players
American men's ice hockey left wingers
Cincinnati Stingers (CHL) players
Ice hockey people from Saint Paul, Minnesota
Maine Mariners players
Michigan State Spartans men's ice hockey players
Philadelphia Flyers players
Railway accident deaths in the United States
Toledo Goaldiggers players
Undrafted National Hockey League players